The Sibley-Hoyt House is a historic house in Pontiac, Michigan that's center is a frame cabin dating to 1820 making it one of Pontiac's first structures. It was built by Solomon and Sarah Sibley, one of the founders of Pontiac. It is also the county's oldest house.

Description 
The Sibley-Hoyt house is a cabin that dates to 1819 or 1820. The sawmill and cabin were owned by Solomon and Sarah Sibley. Located at 146 West Lawrence Street, Pontiac Michigan within the Franklin Boulevard Historic District. The origins of the current house are a cabin measuring 18 feet by 20 feet. It was built on a cellar. The original roof structure for the cabin still exists albeit another larger roof has enclosed it within the attic. It was built soon after the sawmill in Pontiac was running as of 1819. Original cabin floor boards and roof boards measure in excess of 18". There was an original chimney in the cabin that still exists today. Additionally, there are original blue glass windows that were moved to the outside wall. 

The cabin was built on a 10-acre site (outlot 14) part of the original plat of the village of Pontiac. The structure would have been used for lodging for Judge Sibley when in town, but more importantly for itinerant farmers, workers who needed a place to stay while they worked to build their own home or were just residing here while working on building projects. The 10 acres provided ample land in town for growing crops and keeping livestock. The cellar, being on high ground from the town proper, was likely the first cellar in town and a community resource for sure. It kept the milk cool in summer, and root vegetables cool, and from freezing, in winter.

Early additions to the cabin were made across the north and west sides. The front portion of the current house dates to 1840 and was a separate house moved in 1866 or 1867 during Hoyt ownership. The house, dating to around 1840 originally, was moved with two rooms downstairs, a staircase and entry hall, two rooms upstairs with a closet. A birds-eye map from 1867, showing structures and other town features, verifies the existence of the house with the larger house moved to this site. There were additions made to the building that include a bathroom, dining room, fireplace, during the 19th century. The front porch was likely widened at this time. A side porch of Victorian style also was added on the east side with a side door entering onto it. The porch and door are since removed. A screened porch off the back of house was the last addition and appears to be from the 1950s or 60s.

Structural evidence in the cabin's attic and cellar support that the front 2-story house was moved to this site. Patching in of molding, siding, and plaster indicate the front house was part of a greater house and changes were made to it after it was moved to the Sibley-Hoyt house. Existence of a partial chimney and sagging of the front entry hall floor also indicate the house was moved with a fireplace sitting on the floor structure that was never re-supported, causing floor beams to sag.

History 
The house was originally dated to 1840 during the creation of the Franklin Boulevard Historic District in 1982. That date only pertains to the front facade, a two-story mid Greek Revival era structure that was moved to the current site in 1866 or 1867 by George Hoyt and connected to the cabin.  It was owned by Solomon and Sarah Sibley, who were responsible for financing the settlement at Pontiac, the creation of the Pontiac Company and the mercantile firm of Mack, Conant and Sibley.

The cabin remained in the Sibleys' possession for almost ten years when it was sold to William Thompson, another Pontiac Company member. The cabin on its ten acres, became a part of Thompson's greater property, was then sold to Francis Darrow and Abel Peck in 1836 and became part of the Darrow and Peck's Subdivision, Pontiac's second subdivision.

The cabin was bought and sold four times before being repurchased by Francis Darrow, this time as an individual. He held the property until 1861 when it was sold to Richard Elliott. Elliott lost the property to foreclosure and in 1863 it was purchased by Professor George Hoyt. The Hoyt Family would occupy the house for 111 years, ending with the daughter Georgia in 1974.

The house was then purchased in December 1986 by Ronald Gay. He found several inconsistencies with the brief history that existed about the house when he bought it. He used research from the county clerk's office, the Burton Historical Collection in Detroit's main library, and the Pontiac Public Library to determine the current history and renaming of the house.   

In November 2004, the Hoyt House became the Sibley-Hoyt House.

Notable Historical Events 
In 1825, the Sibley's, owner of the cabin sold land to the first African American in Pontiac and Oakland County, Elizabeth Denison, later becoming Elizabeth Denison Forth.  

The house was part of the founding of Pontiac and one of the oldest structures in the state and region. 

The Sibley-Hoyt house is where the Michigan Animal Rescue League began.

Francis Darrow, was an owner twice, lastly and singularly in 1850. Darrow was a known abolitionist. He was treasurer, and a founding member, of the Oakland County Free Discussion and Anti-Slavery Society here in 1836. He owned a large house directly next door on the east side of the Sibley-Hoyt House. It's possible that during the years of the Fugitive Slave Act, enacted in 1850, the Dred Scott Case of 1857, this cabin was used for the purpose of assisting Freedom Seekers.

Notable Designations 

 Library of Congress distinguished American building in 1934
 Michigan State Historic Site in 1958
 National Register of Historic Places in 1971

References

Houses in Oakland County, Michigan